Perian is a discontinued open-source QuickTime component that enabled Apple Inc.’s QuickTime to play several popular video formats not supported natively by QuickTime on macOS. It was a joint development of several earlier open source components based on the multiplatform FFmpeg project's libavcodec and libavformat, as well as liba52 and libmatroska.

It has been featured as the "Download of the Day" on Lifehacker, as well as on several popular blogs including
Ars Technica and
The Unofficial Apple Weblog.

Project shutdown 
On 15 May 2012, the Perian project managers announced on their website that they are shutting down support for the project. In the announcement, they recommended that users look to other products, such as Niceplayer, VLC or MPlayer OS X. They indicated that Perian's source code would be posted online for any developer who wanted to continue with the project. One continuation based on the source code is actively maintained but does not support QuickTime for OS X Mavericks or later.

Supported formats
Perian lent support for many combinations of video, audio, text, and container formats to QuickTime, including the following:

AV codec support for the following:
 MPEG-4 Part 2
 MS-MPEG4 v1, v2 and v3
 H.263
 H.264
 Flash Screen Video
 Truemotion VP6 & VP3
 HuffYUV
 Xiph Vorbis (in Matroska)
 Snow wavelet video
 DOSBox video
 DTS Coherent Acoustics audio
 Nellymoser Asao Codec
 Windows Media Audio (WMA) v1 & v21
 Dolby Digital
 Fraps
 Indeo 2, 3 and 5
 WebM/VP8
 FFV1
 Theora

Subtitle support for the following:
 (Advanced) SubStation Alpha
 SRT
 SAMI
 VobSub

Container format support for the following:
 FLV file format
 NUV file format
 Matroska (MKV)

See also 

 Windows Media Components for QuickTime
 Xiph QuickTime Components
 Combined Community Codec Pack (a similar bundle for Windows)

References

External links 
  – official site

QuickTime
Free video codecs
Free media players
MacOS media players
MacOS-only free software